Brokpa, Drokpa, Dard and Shin is a category of Scheduled Tribes under the Indian constitution.

The category contains tribes who speaks Dardic languages. In the Indian-administered Kashmir region, these tribes are mostly found in the Kargil and Baramulla districts and few of them are found in Leh.They are predominantly Muslim and a few  of them are Buddhist and Hindu

In the Census of India, the demographic numbers of the "Brokpa, Drokpa, Dard, and Shin" Tribes are added together.Dards is the collective name for this group. Following are the Tribes under the catogory:

Baramullah 
 Dard-Shin tribe or Shina people 
Ladakh  
 Drokpa (Shin) Tribe  In Drass valley
 Brokpa (Minaro) in Dha hanu region

Demographics
In the Census of India, the demographic numbers of the "Brokpa, Drokpa, Dard, and Shin" Tribes are added together.Dards is the collective name for this group.

The 2001 Census of India counted 51,957 people in these tribes.Of these, 26,066 people lived in Baramulla, 23,418 in Kargil, 1,002 in Leh and 1,199 in Srinagar.Of the 48,400 counted in 2011, 45,100 were Muslim, 3,144 were Buddhist and 133 were Hindu.

Dard-Shin  of Baramulla   

The Dard-Shin tribe or Shina people is  found in Gurez and Tulail in Baramullah. Gurez valley is home to a distinct Shina-speaking Dard tribe who have been cut off from their mainland Astore, Gilgit, and Chilas by the Line of Control. They  speak the Astori dialect of Shina language.

Drokpa(Shin) Tribe of Drass region 

Drokpa ( Shin) Tribe  in Drass valley  in  Kargil  :They are Muslim Dards known as Drokpa or Shin which is found in the Drass region of Kargil. They are also known as the 'Shin' because of their language, 'Shinna,' which is part of the Dard group of languages in the non-Sanskritic Indo European family. They are also believed to have come from the Dardistan. Despite professing the Sunni faith, they maintain certain customs brought with them from their original home. They speak the Astori dialect of Shina language.

Brokpa(Minaro) In Dha Hanu region 

Brokpa  or Minaro  :

Brokpa or Minaro are  Buddhist Dards and they speak  Brokskat language. They are found in the Aryan valley region. They call themselves "Minaro", while Ladakhis call them Brokpa or Dokhpa. According to the 1991 census of India, there were 1920 Brokpa. They speak the Brokskat or Minaro language which comes under the Eastern Dardic language group.  Minaro practise two religions; one is their traditional "Minaro" religion (spirit worship). The other is Tibetan Buddhism.

Name 

These Scheduled Tribes are called a "group of Dardic Tribes" under Scheduled Tribes of the former Jammu and Kashmir. However, there are other non-tribal Dardic people in the state, such as the Kashmiri. According to the most recent research, the term "Dardic" is not linguistic nor ethnic; it is only a suitable geographical expression expression used to officially choose the Indo-Iranian language that retains the archaic characteristics that are spoken in the north-western Himalayas and in the Hindu Kush. There is no ethnic unity among the speakers of these languages. The languages also cannot be traced to a single linguistic tree model.

References

Scheduled Tribes of India
Scheduled Tribes of Jammu and Kashmir